Marcellin College Randwick is an independent systemic Roman Catholic single-sex secondary day school for boys, located in Randwick in the Eastern Suburbs of Sydney, New South Wales, Australia. Conducted by the Marist Brothers and founded in 1923, Marcellin is a school of the Archdiocese of Sydney, and currently caters for approximately 962 students from Years 7 to 12.

The college is affiliated with the Association of Marist Schools of Australia (AMSA) and the Metropolitan Catholic Colleges Sports Association (MCC).

History 
Marist Brothers founded the college as part of the worldwide Congregation of Marist Colleges which began in 1816 under the guidance of the French priest, Marcellin Champagnat SM.

Archbishop Kelly visited Randwick in 1921, and pressed for the establishment of a school for boys. Land became available in Alison Rd and on 4 November 1922 Dr Sheehan laid the first stone which now forms part of the College Wall. Dr Cyril Fallon campaigned for funds. Br Walstan Curtin was the first headmaster, and welcomed the first students on 29 January 1923. Originally the brothers traveled from Darlinghurst and Hunters Hill, until Br Aquinas managed to purchase the house adjoining the college, and then it became the living quarters for the Brothers. The Marist Brothers have managed the college ever since.

The College celebrated its 90 Year Anniversary in 2013 with a range of special events, celebrations & functions. A new College Sculpture, named Eternity was erected in 2013 in honour of the college's 90 Year landmark and as part of a major revamp of the college's courtyard. It was commissioned and sculpted by sculptor Col Henry. It was blessed on 17 May 2013 at the college's 90 Year Gala Dinner.

In early 2014, major capital works commenced at Marcellin. Planning for these works had been underway since late 2011. The scope of the works includes:

a new library with additional learning spaces and major internal refurbishment
a multi-purpose space to replace the Year 7 rooftop playground
a new canteen
landscaping in the bottom yard
Food Technology and Hospitality facilities
a Drama performance space
alterations to the Marist Centre

The works were completed by the beginning of the 2015 school year.

At the end of the 2014 academic year, Br David Hall concluded his term as Headmaster at Marcellin College. Mr John Hickey was later appointed as his successor, becoming the 24th and first lay Headmaster of the college.

Headmasters 

The following individuals have served as Headmaster of Marcellin College Randwick:

Academic
Marcellin College has always achieved strong academic results, with students regularly attaining Universities Admission Index (UAI) scores of over 90. In 2005, student Christopher Beshara achieved a UAI 100, the first student in Marcellin College Randwick to achieve a UAI 100 - many other students achieving over UAI 91 annually. Following the release of the 2007 NSW Higher School Certificate (HSC) results, The Daily Telegraph ranked Marcellin College 78th in the top 200 best performing schools in New South Wales. In addition to HSC success, the school has achieved in academic pursuits such as debating, oratory and chess.

Sport 
Marcellin College is a member of the Metropolitan Catholic Colleges (MCC) sport program. Through this association, the college competes against schools such as Marist College Kogarah, Christian Brothers' High School, Lewisham, De La Salle College Ashfield, Marist Catholic College North Shore, Champagnat Catholic College Pagewood, St. Leo's Catholic College and LaSalle Catholic College, Bankstown, in a variety of sports including swimming, athletics, soccer, rugby league, tennis, golf, volleyball, touch football, basketball, squash and cricket. (Also rugby union, but it was disbanded in 2009).

Traditionally, Marcellin College has a strong history in sport (see below) with many students progressing to the elite level in their chosen sport, notably in rugby league, along with swimming.

Notable alumni 
Marcellin College Randwick alumni are traditionally known as "Old Boys", with the school's Alumni association called the "Marcellin College Ex-Students Association". Some notable Marcellin Old Boys include:

Business
 Charlie Bell – former President and CEO of McDonald's

Clergy and religious
 Br Charles Howard FMS – Superior General of the Marist Brothers 1985-1993
 Most Rev David Walker – Bishop of Broken Bay 1996-2013

Entertainment, media and the arts
 Mitchell Butel – actor
 Luke Carroll – actor
 Kerry Casey – actor
 Jon Cleary – author
 James Galea – magician and actor
 Bob Hornery – actor
 Peter James – cinematographer and director of photography
 Michael Lynch – arts administrator

Medicine and science
 Merv Cross – doctor of sports medicine and rugby league player

Politics, public service and the law
 Lionel Bowen – politician; Deputy Prime Minister of Australia from 1983 to 1990
 Michael Daley – politician; NSW Shadow Treasurer and Shadow Minister for Finance and Services
 John Lawrence O’Meally – judge

Sport
 Malcolm Allen – swimmer
 Braith Anasta – rugby league player
 Tom Bellew  – former Chairman of the New South Wales Rugby League and Director of the Australian Rugby League
 Luke Branighan – rugby league player
 Shawn Budd – snooker player 
 Richard Chee Quee – first player of Chinese origin to play first-class cricket in Australia
 Michael Cheika – rugby union coach and former rugby union player, Australian national team (Wallabies) head coach since 2014, NSW Waratahs coach 2013-2015
 Jason Clark – rugby league player
 Ben Davis – AFL player for the Adelaide Crows
 Denis Donoghue – boxer & rugby league player
 Andrew Durante – football player, Wellington Phoenix FC captain, 2008 Joe Marston Medal recipient
 Jordan Foote – AFL player
 Dr Nathan Gibbs – rugby league player
 Campbell Graham – rugby league player
 Aaron Gray – rugby league player
 Errol Gulden – AFL player
 Marty Gurr – rugby league player
 Lachlan Lam – rugby league player
 Reni Maitua – rugby league player
 Darren Maroon – rugby league player
 Shannan McPherson – rugby league player
 Jeff Orford – rugby league player
 Rick Pendleton – paralympic swimmer
 Willie Peters – rugby league player
 Eddy Pettybourne – rugby league player
 Sam Robson – Australian-English first-class cricketer
 Iosia Soliola – rugby league player
 John Sutton – rugby league player
 Tom Symonds – rugby league player
 Peter Tunks – rugby league player
 Joe Williams – rugby league player and professional boxer
 Ken Wright – rugby union and rugby league player

See also 

 List of Catholic schools in New South Wales
 Catholic education in Australia

References

External links
Marcellin College Randwick Website
MCC Association
Marist Schools Australia

Roman Catholic Archdiocese of Sydney
Catholic secondary schools in Sydney
Randwick, New South Wales
Association of Marist Schools of Australia
Boys' schools in New South Wales
Educational institutions established in 1923
Metropolitan Catholic Colleges Sports Association
1923 establishments in Australia